Irfan Elahi (born 23 September 1995) is a Pakistani cricketer. He made his first-class debut for Khan Research Laboratories in the 2014–15 Quaid-e-Azam Trophy on 12 October 2014. He made his List A debut for Sui Northern Gas Pipelines Limited in the 2018–19 Quaid-e-Azam One Day Cup on 13 September 2018.

References

External links
 

1995 births
Living people
Pakistani cricketers
Khan Research Laboratories cricketers
Sui Northern Gas Pipelines Limited cricketers
Place of birth missing (living people)